Il maresciallo Rocca (Marshal Rocca) is an Italian crime television series.

Cast

 Gigi Proietti as  Marshal Giovanni Rocca 
 Stefania Sandrelli as Margherita Rizzo 
 Veronica Pivetti as Francesca Mariani 
 Sergio Fiorentini as Brigadier Alfio Cacciapuoti 
 Mattia Sbragia as Prosecutor Gennaro Mannino 
 Paolo Gasparini as Michele Banti 
 Francesca Rinaldi as Daniela Rocca 
 Massimiliano Virgilii as Carmelo Russo 
 Maurizio Aiello as Marco Sallustri 
 Silvia Pasero as Antonella Massimini 
 Luigi Montini as Morissi 
 Ennio Girolami as Cesare Massimini 
 Olimpia Di Nardo as Miss Massimini
 Roberto Accornero as Capitain Aloisi

See also
List of Italian television series

External links
 

Italian television series
1996 Italian television series debuts
2005 Italian television series endings
1990s Italian television series
2000s Italian television series
RAI original programming